Dexithea is a genus of beetles in the family Cerambycidae, containing the following species:

 Dexithea fabricii (Chevrolat, 1860)
 Dexithea humeralis Chemsak & Noguera, 2001
 Dexithea klugii (Laporte & Gory, 1835)

References

Clytini